[[File:The Walking Man rear.jpg|thumb|The Walking Man"'s rear]]The Walking Man is a bronze sculpture by the French sculptor Auguste Rodin. This sculpture was made in 1907.

The best example of Rodin’s ‘sketchy’ impressionist sculpture also happens to be his most well-known ‘incomplete’ figure. This work personifies the latter part of Rodin’s career: the dynamic pose of a partial figure. Deriving much from Rodin’s earlier work St. John the Baptist Preaching, including the powerful stance, Rodin had stripped all academic associations from his figure, and instead focused on what he considered essential: the dynamic pose.

According to the bibliography supplied by the National Gallery of Art, The Walking Man is a version of St. John without head and arms. This sculpture was previously considered a preliminary study for the complete Baptist and was based on the movement of that piece. According to Albert Elsen and Henry Moore's suggestions, The Walking Man was created for the purpose of a Roman or Greek art without any live reference.

Praise
The art historian Leo Steinberg said of The Walking Man’s pose: The stance is profoundly unclassical, especially in the digging-in conveyed by the pigeon-toed stride and the rotation of the upper torso. Unlike the balanced, self-possessed classical posture with both feet turned out, Rodin uses the kind of step that brings all power to bear on the moment’s work

Inspiration
The statue has served as the inspiration for the works of other artists, such as Carl Sandburg, who described it in his 1916 poem, "The Walking Man of Rodin": THE WALKING MAN OF RODIN
Legs hold a torso away from the earth.
And a regular high poem of legs is here.
Powers of bone and cord raise a belly and lungs
Out of ooze and over the loam where eyes look and ears hear
And arms have a chance to hammer and shoot and run motors.
You make us
Proud of our legs, old man.

And you left off the head here,
The skull found always crumbling neighbor of the ankles. 

See also
List of sculptures by Auguste Rodin
 List of public art in Houston

External links
 Link to The Walking Man on the official website of the Musée Rodin.
 The Walking Man, Norton Simon Art Foundation Object Number M.1966.05.S: The Walking Man, bronze cast No. 7, edition of 12.
 The Walking Man, Iris & B. Gerald Cantor Center for Visual Arts at Stanford University, Object Number 1982.306
 The Walking Man entry, including downloadable 3D stereolithography (.stl) file, based on photogrammetric survey of Norton Simon Art Foundation Object Number: M.1966.05.S: The Walking Man, bronze cast No. 7, edition of 12, on Thingiverse.com
 The Walking Man 3D stereolithography (.stl) file viewer, based on photogrammetric survey of Norton Simon Art Foundation Object Number: M.1966.05.S: The Walking Man, bronze cast No. 7, edition of 12, on Thingiverse.com.
 BIBLIOGRAPHY (supplied by The National Gallery of Art, Washington)Rodin: The B. Gerald Cantor Collection, a full text exhibition catalog from The Metropolitan Museum of Art, which contains material on The Walking Man''

Sculptures by Auguste Rodin
Sculptures of men
Nude sculptures
1878 sculptures
Sculptures of the Art Institute of Chicago
Franklin D. Murphy Sculpture Garden
Hirshhorn Museum and Sculpture Garden
Lillie and Hugh Roy Cullen Sculpture Garden
Outdoor sculptures in California
Outdoor sculptures in Washington, D.C.
Sculptures of the Museum of Modern Art (New York City)
Sculptures of the Smithsonian Institution
Sculptures of the Musée Rodin
Sculptures depicting John the Baptist